Nominal may refer to:

Linguistics and grammar
 Nominal (linguistics), one of the parts of speech
 Nominal, the adjectival form of "noun", as in "nominal agreement" (= "noun agreement")
 Nominal sentence, a sentence without a finite verb
 Noun phrase or nominal phrase

Mathematics
 Nominal data, a form of categorical data in statistics
 Nominal number, a number used as an identifier in mathematics

Titles
 Post-nominal letters, letters indicating a title, placed after the name of a person
 Pre-nominal letters, letters  indicating a title, placed before the name of a person

Other uses
 Nominal aphasia or anomic aphasia, a problem remembering words and names
 Nominal category, a group of objects or ideas that can be collectively grouped on the basis of one or more shared, arbitrary characteristics
 Nominal damages, a small award to compensate for technical harm
 Nominal GDP, a raw gross domestic product value uncompensated for inflation or deflation
 Nominal techniques, computer science techniques for working with formal languages with name binding constructs
 Real versus nominal value,  an accepted condition which is a goal or an approximation as opposed to the real value
 Real versus nominal value (economics), the face value of currency not corrected for inflation or compound interest
 Nominal type system, a type system where properties of a data type are determined by explicit declaration and/or the name of a type

See also
 Nominal group (disambiguation)
 
 Nominalism
 Nominalization
 Titular (disambiguation)